The Diocese of Gaylord is a Latin Church ecclesiastical territory, or diocese, of the Catholic Church in the northern region of the lower peninsula of Michigan in the United States.  The diocese is a suffragan diocese in the ecclesiastical province of the metropolitan Archdiocese of Detroit.

Territory 
It comprises the 21 most northern counties of the lower peninsula of the state, and includes the cities of Gaylord, Traverse City, Alpena, Manistee and Petoskey..

The diocese has a population of 505,000, 66,000 of whom are Catholic.  It contains 77 parishes and 17 schools.

History

Early history 
During the 17th century, present-day Michigan was part of the French colony of New France. The Diocese of Quebec had jurisdiction over the region. In 1763, the Michigan area became part of the British Province of Quebec, forbidden from settlement by American colonists. After the American Revolution, the Michigan region became part of the new United States.  For Catholics, Michigan was now under the jurisdiction of the Archdiocese of Baltimore, which then comprised the entire country.

In 1808, Pope Pius VII erected the Diocese of Bardstown in Kentucky, with jurisdiction over the new Michigan Territory. On June 19, 1821, the pope erected the Diocese of Cincinnati, taking the Michigan Territory from the Diocese of Bardstown.

Pope Gregory XVI formed the Diocese of Detroit on March 8, 1833, covering the entire Michigan Territory. Pope Leo XIII erected the Diocese of Grand Rapids on May 19, 1882 and Pope Pius XI formed the Diocese of Saginaw in 1938.  These two diocese covered the Gaylord area.

1971 to present 
Pope Paul VI created the Diocese of Gaylord on December 19, 1970 from territory separated from the Dioceses of Saginaw and Grand Rapids, and erected it on July 20, 1971. He named Reverend Edmund Szoka of the Diocese of Marquette as first bishop and the church of St. Mary, Our Lady of Mount Carmel Cathedral as the cathedral. As bishop of Gaylord, Szoka improved the annulment consideration process, drawing from his experience in the matrimonial tribunal in Marquette. In 1981, Pope John Paul iI appointed him as archbishop of the Archdiocese of Detroit.

On October 13, 1981, Pope John Paul II appointed Rose as the second bishop of the Diocese of Gaylord.In 1989, the pope named Rose as bishop of the Diocese of Grand Rapids.  John Paul II replaced him with Auxiliary Bishop Patrick R. Cooney of the Archdiocese of Detroit later that year. Cooney died in 2012.

On October 7, 2009, Pope Benedict XVI named Reverend Bernard Hebda from the Diocese of Pittsburgh as the fourth bishop of the Diocese of Gaylord. Hebda served in Gaylord until 2013, when he was appointed as coadjutor bishop of the Archdiocese of Newark by Pope Francis. The pope in 2014 named Reverend Steven J. Raica from the Diocese of Lansing as the next bishop of Gaylord. In 2020, Francis moved Raica to the Diocese of Birmingham to serve there as bishop.

The current bishop of Gaylord is Jeffrey Walsh from the Diocese of Scranton.  He was appointed by Francis in 2022.

Sexual abuse 
In 2002, Bishop Cooney allowed Reverend Gerald Shirilla to serve as pastor of a church with a school, despite knowing that Shirilla had been removed from the Archdiocese of Detroit in 1993 following decades-long allegations of sexual abuse. After the Detroit Free Press reported on the situation in 2003, Cooney said that Shirilla had made "some errors in judgment" but was "no threat to the well-being of our children," only to suspend him two weeks later.

Bishops

Bishops of Gaylord
Edmund Casimir Szoka (1971–1981), appointed Archbishop of Detroit and later President of the Prefecture for the Economic Affairs of the Holy See and President of the Pontifical Commission for Vatican City State and Governorate of Vatican City State (elevated to Cardinal in 1988)
Robert John Rose (1981–1989), appointed Bishop of Grand Rapids
Patrick R. Cooney (1989–2009)
Bernard Hebda (2009–2013), appointed Coadjutor Archbishop of Newark and later Archbishop of Saint Paul and Minneapolis
Steven J. Raica (2014 – March 25, 2020), appointed Bishop of Birmingham
Jeffrey Walsh (2022-Present)

Other priest of this diocese who became bishop
Chad Zielinski, appointed Bishop of Fairbanks in 2014

High schools
 Catholic Central High School, Manistee
 St. Francis High School, Traverse City
 St. Mary Cathedral High School, Gaylord
 St. Mary High School, Lake Leelanau
 St. Michael Academy, Petoskey

See also

 Catholic Church by country
 Catholic Church hierarchy
 List of the Catholic dioceses of the United States

References
*   1.

External links
Roman Catholic Diocese of Gaylord Official Site

 
Gaylord
Gaylord
Christian organizations established in 1970
Gaylord
1970 establishments in Michigan